Miss Polo International 2018 was the 1st edition of Miss Polo International pageant, held on 28 August 2018 at Transcorp Hilton Hotel, Abuja, Nigeria.

A total of 17 contestants competed for the inaugural Miss Polo International title.

Results

Continental queens

Contestants 
17 contestants competed for the title of Miss Polo International 2018.

 – Nassima Mechalikh
 – Elina Jana Krainz
 – Renata Puppin
 – Rose Armelle Nikiéma
 – Foje Jencey
 – Veronika Robotkova
 – Monika Kužmová
 – Penny Yeboah
 – Anna Opalko
 – Nasneen Sheikh
 – Yoho Otomo
 - Sheila Kanini
 – Stella Whyte
 – Galina Lukina
 – Alexia Navarro
 – Jackie Meela
 – Andrea Carrillo

References

2018 beauty pageants